The 41st Filmfare Awards were held in 1996.

Dilwale Dulhania Le Jayenge, considered one of the most successful films of Bollywood, and Rangeela led the ceremony with 14 nominations each, followed by Karan Arjun with 10 nominations.

Dilwale Dulhania Le Jayenge won 10 awards – a record at the time – including Best Film, Best Director (Aditya Chopra), Best Actor (Shah Rukh Khan), Best Actress (Kajol) and Best Supporting Actress (Farida Jalal), thus becoming the most-awarded film at the ceremony. 

Other films winning multiple awards included Rangeela with 7, Barsaat with 4 and Karan Arjun with 2 awards.

Madhuri Dixit received dual nominations for Best Actress for her performances in Raja and Yaraana, but lost to Kajol who won the award for Dilwale Dulhania Le Jayenge.

Kajol won her first of a record-setting five awards for Best Actress for her performance in Dilwale Dulhania Le Jayenge.

A. R. Rahman won his first Best Music Director award at Filmfare for his first Hindi film Rangeela.

Main awards

Best Film
 Dilwale Dulhaniya Le Jayenge 
Akele Hum Akele Tum
Karan Arjun
Raja
Rangeela

Best Director
 Aditya Chopra – Dilwale Dulhaniya Le Jayenge 
Indra Kumar – Raja
Mansoor Khan – Akele Hum Akele Tum
Rakesh Roshan – Karan Arjun
Ram Gopal Verma – Rangeela

Best Actor
 Shah Rukh Khan – Dilwale Dulhaniya Le Jayenge 
Aamir Khan – Rangeela
Ajay Devgan – Naajayaz
Govinda – Coolie No.1
Salman Khan – Karan Arjun

Best Actress
 Kajol – Dilwale Dulhaniya Le Jayenge 
Madhuri Dixit – Raja
Madhuri Dixit – Yaraana
Manisha Koirala – Akele Hum Akele Tum
Urmila Matondkar – Rangeela

Best Supporting Actor
 Jackie Shroff – Rangeela 
Amrish Puri – Dilwale Dulhaniya Le Jayenge
Anil Kapoor – Trimurti
Naseeruddin Shah – Naajayaz
Paresh Rawal – Raja

Best Supporting Actress
 Farida Jalal – Dilwale Dulhaniya Le Jayenge 
Aruna Irani – Kartavya
Raakhee – Karan Arjun
Rita Bhaduri – Raja
Tanvi Azmi – Akele Hum Akele Tum

Best Comic Actor
 Anupam Kher – Dilwale Dulhaniya Le Jayenge 
Ashok Saraf – Karan Arjun
Johnny Lever – Karan Arjun
Kader Khan – Coolie No.1

Best Villain
 Mithun Chakraborty – Jallad 
Amrish Puri – Karan Arjun
Ashish Vidyarthi – Drohkaal
Danny Denzongpa – Barsaat
Mohan Agashe – Trimurti

Best Music Director 
 Rangeela – A. R. Rahman 
Akele Hum Akele Tum – Anu Malik
Dilwale Dulhania Le Jayenge – Jatin–Lalit
Karan Arjun – Rajesh Roshan
Raja – Nadeem-Shravan

Best Lyricist
 Dilwale Dulhaniya Le Jayenge – Anand Bakshi for Tujhe Dekha To 
Akele Hum Akele Tum – Majrooh Sultanpuri for Raja Ko Rani Se
Dilwale Dulhaniya Le Jayenge – Anand Bakshi for Ho Gaya Hai Tujhko
Rangeela – Mehboob for Kya Karen
Rangeela – Mehboob for Tanha Tanha

Best Playback Singer, Male
 Dilwale Dulhaniya Le Jayenge – Udit Narayan for Mehndi Laga Ke Rakhna 
Akele Hum Akele Tum – Udit Narayan for Raja Ko Rani Se
Dilwale Dulhaniya Le Jayenge – Kumar Sanu for Tujhe Dekha To
Haqeeqat – Hariharan for Dil Ne Dil

Best Playback Singer, Female
 Yaraana – Kavita Krishnamurthy for Mera Piya Ghar Aaya 
Akele Hum Akele Tum – Alka Yagnik for Raja Ko Rani Se
Raja – Alka Yagnik for Akhiyan Milaun
Rangeela – Kavita Krishnamurthy for Pyaar Yeh Jaane
Rangeela – Shweta Shetty for Mangta Hai Kya

Best Debut, Male 
 Bobby Deol – Barsaat

Best Debut, Female
 Twinkle Khanna – Barsaat

Best Story
 Rangeela – Ram Gopal Verma

Best Screenplay
 Dilwale Dulhaniya Le Jayenge – Aditya Chopra

Best Dialogue
 Dilwale Dulhaniya Le Jayenge – Aditya Chopra and Javed Siddiqui

R. D. Burman Award
 Mehboob

Best Action
 Karan Arjun

Best Art Direction
 Prem – Bijon Dasgupta

Best Choreography
 Rangeela – Ahmed Khan for Rangeela Re

Best Cinematography
 Barsaat – Santosh Sivan

Best Costume Design
 Rangeela – Manish Malhotra

Best Editing
 Karan Arjun – Sanjay Verma

Best Sound
 Barsaat – Rakesh Ranjan

Lifetime Achievement Award
 Ashok Kumar, Vyjayanthimala and Sunil Dutt

Special Award
 Asha Bhosle for the song "Tanha Tanha" in Rangeela. Long back, she stopped accepting nominations for Best Female Playback Singer, so Filmfare awarded her the Special Award for her rendition.

Critics' awards

Best Film
 Bombay

Best Actress
 Manisha Koirala – Bombay

Best Documentary
 A Narmada Diary

See also
 42nd Filmfare Awards
 Filmfare Awards

References

 https://www.imdb.com/event/ev0000245/1996/

Filmfare Awards
Filmfare